The Tribute to Texas Children Monument is an outdoor memorial commemorating children of Texas, installed on the Texas State Capitol grounds in Austin, Texas, United States. The monument was sculpted by Lawrence Ludtke, funded by students from 600 schools across the state, and erected in 1998. It features bronze statues of children on a field trip to the Capitol.

See also

 1998 in art

References

External links
 

1998 establishments in Texas
1998 sculptures
Bronze sculptures in Texas
Monuments and memorials in Texas
Outdoor sculptures in Austin, Texas
Sculptures of children in the United States
Statues in Texas